The Australian Sport Awards, originally called the Sport Australia Awards, were established by the Confederation of Australian Sport in 1980. From 1980 to 1996, the awards were limited to seven categories.

In 1993, there was a merger of the Sport Australia Awards and the ABC Sports Award of the Year.

The Dawn Fraser Award was introduced in 2000 to reflect the achievements and standing of Dawn Fraser in Australia and on the international sporting stage.

Major athlete awards

Young athlete awards

Coaching, administration and officiating awards

Other awards

See also

 Sport in Australia
 Australian Institute of Sport Awards
 Sport Australia Hall of Fame
 ABC Sports Award of the Year
 World Trophy for Australasia

References

External links
Table of all Australian Sport Award Winners from 1980-2007

Australian sports trophies and awards
History of sport in Australia
Awards established in 1980
Austra
Australian sports coaching awards